This is a '''list of mayors of Medicine Hat, Alberta.

Mayors

References

Medicine Hat